The glassy darter (Etheostoma vitreum) is a species of freshwater ray-finned fish, a darter from the subfamily Etheostomatinae, part of the family Percidae, which also contains the perches, ruffes and pikeperches. It is found from the Bush River in Maryland to Neuse River in North Carolina. It inhabits sandy runs of creeks and small to medium rivers.

References

Freshwater fish of the United States
Etheostoma
Fish described in 1870
Taxa named by Edward Drinker Cope